A spotter in auto racing is a trained team member whose job is to relay information to their driver, keeping them alert of what is occurring on the track. They are typically positioned higher, atop one of the grandstands or other support buildings, to see the entire track. Spotters keep in constant contact with their drivers via two-way radio communication. Spotters are considered the drivers' "eyes" and are one of the more notable yet simple, safety measures adopted by professional auto racing in the past two decades.

History and facts

Spotters became commonplace in NASCAR and CART in the late 1980s and early 1990s. Two-way communication between the driver and pit crew began in the 1970s and early 1980s, however, all communication was based in the pit area, and was primarily to discuss pit stop strategy and mechanical problems with the cars. No tracks had video boards, and monitors carrying the satellite feeds of the race telecast (which is standard in the pit areas nowadays) was still decades away. Pit crews notably had very little information on what was going on out on the track, outside of what they could observe firsthand from the pits.

At some point in the 1980s, teams began experimenting with an additional crew member stationed at another position at the track. Some teams would station a crew member in an observation tower, a photography stand, or some would simply purchase tickets in the grandstands. The position gave the teams a unique view of the track, and allowed the "spotter" to relay information that could not been observed from the pits. Initially, the information gained was simple. For instance, if a crash occurred on the track, he could warn his driver about the location of the crash, and could advise on how to take evasive action. At other times, he could observe the other cars, and relay information about their performance, if that knowledge would be beneficial. Also, before the teams possessed weather radar in the pits, the spotters could relay information about approaching rain, for strategic purposes.

By the early to mid-1990s, NASCAR began to standardize the organization of the spotters, and eventually made them mandatory. At each track, a special area was reserved for the spotters, one with the best view of the circuit. At certain tracks, such as Daytona, Talladega, and Indianapolis, multiple spotters are utilized, since it is not possible to see all the way around from one vantage point.

Spotters' duties increased as the years went by, and now include assisting drivers (particularly in "pack racing") in making passes and racing in heavy traffic. Since the drivers' helmets, wrap-around seats, and various safety equipment make peripheral vision difficult, and NASCAR race cars in all levels (Whelen Modified Tour, Craftsman Truck Series, Xfinity Series and NASCAR Cup Series) have no right side mirrors,  the spotter's primary role is to become 'the mirrors' for the drivers, to notify drivers of possible passing maneuvers from the blind spots and to avoid crashes.

Spotters also are known to work amongst each other, for mutually beneficial situations, even if they are competitors. For instance, spotters for two cars running together might consummate a deal for their respective drivers to pit together, that way they could re-enter the track together, as drafting partners. Spotters on competing teams might also arrange for their respective drivers to "gang up" on another car, so that they work together to improve their positions. Altercations on the track can also lead to heated exchanges among the respective spotters.

Spotters are former drivers, owners, instructors, or various crew members who do not otherwise have in-race duties. Spotters normally work closely with the driver, developing a personal vernacular and codes when strategies (especially pit orders) are required to avoid information being leaked to other drivers, crew chiefs and fellow spotters, and decide to what degree of detail the driver wants his information relayed. Some drivers may prefer constant streams of information, while others may insist on limited chatter. In addition, they may have agreed upon "dark" periods, where no discussion is allowed (e.g., a difficult part of the track or during a period of intense racing requiring deep concentration).

The job of spotting is often considered difficult and undesirable, despite its simple outward appearance. Spotters are required to stand for extended periods of time and can not break concentration, during practice sessions, time trials, and race periods, which could last as long as four or more hours at a time. Breaks are infrequent, or non-existent. Weather conditions in the spotters' high perches are usually to the extreme; unshaded from hot sun, unshielded from high winds (and wind chills), and unprotected from rain. The responsibility of keeping their driver safe on the track is also a working burden. Lapses in concentration can have considerable consequences to their driver on the track.

References

http://auto.howstuffworks.com/auto-racing/nascar/jobs/nascar-driver-communicate3.htm
https://www.yahoo.com/autos/bp/life-on-the-spotter-s-stands--and-the-high-stress-world-of-being-a-racer-s-eyes-in-the-sky-162805662.html
http://www.godanriver.com/sports/auto_racing/martinsville/an-inside-look-at-what-spotters-do-during-a-nascar/article_cf317c08-b6e3-11e3-b719-0017a43b2370.html?mode=jqm

Motorsport terminology